Istra is a river in Moscow Oblast, Russia. It is a left tributary of the Moskva. The town of Istra is located on it.

References

Rivers of Moscow Oblast